Twin brothers and filmmakers Mark Polonia and John Polonia (born September 30, 1968) founded Polonia Bros Entertainment and Cinegraphic Productions. Between them they have written, directed and produced over 40 feature films, mostly in the genres of horror and sci fi, making them low-budget film cult icons.

When John Polonia died suddenly at the age of 39 on February 25, 2008, Mark Polonia continued to make films with childhood friend and longtime film collaborator Matt Satterly, through their production company Cinegraphic Productions.

Early days
The youngest of five siblings, the brothers were interested in and making films from a very early age. Their first commercial release was Splatter Farm, released on VHS by Donna Michele Productions in 1987, a shot-on-video offering, written, acted, directed and filmed by the teenage brothers and a high school friend.

Career
Although the brothers had mixed feelings about this film in later years (according to their DVD commentary), in part because the initial release was a rough cut and not edited to their satisfaction, it contained many of the signature elements that would come to define the Polonias' work – a primitive production quality reflecting a very limited budget; the brothers themselves appearing in key roles; liberal use of people and places available to them through their day-to-day lives, and homage to the horror films they grew up with and loved.

In 1996 the brothers' alien invasion film Feeders was picked up by Blockbuster in the aftermath of the commercial success of Independence Day, and became Blockbuster's No. 1 independent-film rental for the year. Starring John Polonia and fellow-B-movie maker Jon McBride (Cannibal Campout, Woodchipper Massacre) in their first foray together, this film about an invasion of Earth by small rubbery flesh-eating monsters with no mouths marked the Polonias' first wide distribution and paved the way for future releases – perhaps 20 more of them before John's death in 2008.

Jon McBride became a regular collaborator with the brothers, and over time a fairly extensive group of actors, technicians, special effects artists and others came to work repeatedly with the brothers on horror films that aimed to entertain at all costs. Killer piranhas, killer Easter bunnies, haunted houses, trips to Mars, assorted demons, all were covered in several decades of film-making.

In 2007 they released a new and improved cut of Splatter Farm, on DVD through Camp Motion Pictures. The new version is missing a couple of the more outrageous scenes that made the original a 'cult classic', but is nonetheless a more professional-looking offering, easier to follow, and augmented by excellent and entertaining commentary and featurettes – which also have become trademarks of the brothers' DVD offerings.

Within the indie film community, the brothers were known for their kindness and generosity to aspiring film-makers.

Polonia Brothers Entertainment and Cinegraphic Productions released Halloweenight, based on a screenplay by, and dedicated to the memory of, the late John Polonia, in October 2009.

In 2010 Mark Polonia dissolved Cinegraphic Productions after the sudden passing of partner Matt Satterly to concentrate solely on the Polonia Bros Entertainment (PBE) brand.

Since his brother's passing in 2008 Mark Polonia has been steadily producing and directing new films with long-time collaborator Brett Piper.

In early 2021 writer Douglas Waltz self-published the book "Monstervision: The Films of John and Mark Polonia". The paperback is a chronicle of 55 movies, some produced jointly by the brothers and the remainder solely by Mark Polonia. It also includes recollections from people who have worked on Polonia Bros. Entertainment films (mostly actors), along with interviews and set photos. And also in 2021, Waltz began publishing an annual print zine called "The Polonia Papers", which details new Polonia Bros. Entertainment movies released each year.

Filmography
 Church of the Damned; 1985, released 1985 by the Polonia Brothers
 Hallucinations; 1986, released 2007 as an extra on Splatter Beach
 Splatter Farm; 1986, released 1987 Donna Michelle Productions, released 2007 Camp Motion Pictures
 Lethal Nightmare; Filmed 1987 – released 2013 Sub Rosa / SRS Limited Release
 Saurians; released 1994 on Polonia Brothers Entertainment 
 Hellspawn; released 2003 on Brentwood 4-pack "Spawn of the Devil"
 How to Slay a Vampire; released 2004 on Brentwood 4-pack "Blood Hunt"
 3000 Bullets; unreleased
 Savage Vows; released 1995 on Brentwood 4-pack "Illicit Affairs, Savage Vows"
 Feeders; released 1996 Blockbuster, released 2003 Sub Rosa Studios
 Feeders 2: Slay Bells; released 2003 Sub Rosa Studios
 Terror House; released 2004 Sub Rosa Studios
 Nightcrawlers; currently re-released 2003 on Brentwood 4-pack "Spawn of the Devil"
 Bad Magic; released by Sub Rosa Studios
 The House That Screamed; released 2000 Sub Rosa Studios
 Dweller; re-released 2004 on Brentwood 4-pack "Sleazy Slashers"
 Dinosaur Chronicles; re-released 2004 on Brentwood 4-pack "Galaxy of Terror"
 Blood Red Planet; released 2000, re-released 2005 on Brentwood 4-pack "Galaxy of Terror"
 Night Thirst; released 2002, re-released 2004 on Brentwood 4-pack "Sleazy Slashers"
 Hellgate: The House that Screamed 2; released 2001 Sub Rosa Studios
 Gorilla Warfare: Battle of the Apes; not yet released
 Preylien: Alien Predators; released 2005 on Brentwood 4-pack "Galaxy of Terror"
 Among Us; released 2004 Sub Rosa Studios
 Peter Rottentail; released 2004 Sub Rosa Studios
 Razorteeth; released 2005 Sub Rosa Studios
 Black Mass (a.k.a. Dead Knight); released Cine Excel Entertainment in Japan
 Wildcat; released Cine Excel Entertainment in Japan
 Splatter Beach; released 2007 Camp Motion Pictures
 Forest Primeval; released 2008 Tempe Entertainment
 Monster Movie; released 2008 Tempe Entertainment
 Halloweenight; released 2009 Tempe Entertainment
 Army of Wolves; 2010
 Muckman; released 2009 Chemical Burn Entertainment (Directed by Brett Piper)
 E.V.E. of Destruction; released 2012 Cine Excel Entertainment
 The Dark Sleep; Released April 2013 Retromedia Entertainment (Written and Directed by Brett Piper)
 Empire of the Apes 3D; released 2013 Sterling Entertainment
 Chainsaw Killer; released 2013 Sub Rosa Studios
 Feeders – Directors Cut; released June 2013 Sub Rosa Studios
 Camp Blood First Slaughter; released 2014 Sterling Entertainment
 Jurassic Prey (alternate title "Meateaters"); released 2015 Wild Eye Releasing
 Queen Crab; released 2015 Wild Eye Releasing (Written and Directed by Brett Piper)
 Amityville Death House; released 2015 Retromedia
 Bigfoot Vs. Zombies; released 2016 Wild Eye Releasing
 Sharkenstein; released 2016 Wild Eye Releasing
 Amityville Exorcism; released 2017 Wild Eye Releasing
 Land Shark; released 2017 Camp Motion Pictures
 Revolt of the Empire of the Apes; released 2017 Sterling Entertainment
 Camp Blood 7; released 2017 Sterling Entertainment
 Ghost of Camp Blood (Camp Blood 8); released 2018 Sterling Entertainment
 War Raiders; released 2018 Sterling Entertainment
 Frozen Sasquatch; released 2018 Sterling Entertainment
 Alien Surveillance; released 2018 Wild Eye Releasing
 Robowar (formerly Battle Bots); released 2018 Sterling Entertainment
 In Search Of; unreleased 2018 Camp Motion Pictures
 Camp Blood Kills; released 2019 Sterling Entertainment
 Deadly Playthings; released 2019 SRS Cinema
 Bride of the Werewolf; released 2019 Sterling Entertainment
 Amityville Island; released 2020 Wild Eye Releasing
 Shark Encounters of the Third Kind; released 2020 Wild Eye Releasing
 Return to Splatter Farm; released 2020 Wild Eye Releasing (Directed by Mark Polonia and Jeff Kirkendall)
 Children of Camp Blood; released 2020 Sterling Entertainment
 Invasion of the Empire of the Apes; released 2021 Sterling Entertainment
 Camp Murder; released 2021 SRS Cinema
 Virus Shark; released 2021 SRS Cinema
 Dune World; released 2021 SRS Cinema
 Jurassic Shark 2: Aquapocalypse; released 2021 Wild Eye Releasing
 Noah's Shark; released 2021 Wild Eye Releasing
 Hell on the Shelf; released 2021 SRS Cinema 
 Sister Krampus; released 2022 SRS Cinema 
 R.I.P. Van Winkle; released 2022 Alpha Home Entertainment (on DVD as "RIP"); released 2022 Wild Eye Releasing (on streaming as "R.I.P. Van Winkle") (Directed by Frank Durant and Mark Polonia)  
 Reel Monsters; released 2022 Camp Motion Pictures
 House Squatch; released 2022 SRS Cinema  
 Feeders 3; May 2022 release Wild Eye Releasing
 Sharkula; June 2022 release Wild Eye Releasing
 Amityville in Space; July 2022 release Wild Eye Releasing
 Doll Shark; released 2022 SRS Cinema 
 Motorboat; anticipated 2023 release SRS Cinema 
 R.I.P. Van Winkle Part 2; anticipated 2023 release (Directed by Mark Polonia and Jeff Kirkendall) 
 R.I.P. Van Winkle Part 3; anticipated 2023 release (Directed by Mark Polonia and Jeff Kirkendall)

References

External links
 Article on John Polonia
 Article on Mark Polonia
 Polonia Brothers Entertainment on the Internet Movie Database

American film directors
American film producers
American male screenwriters
American male film actors
Horror film directors
Sibling filmmakers